A by-election for the seat of MacDonnell in the Northern Territory Legislative Assembly was held on 28 March 1981. The by-election was triggered by the resignation of Labor Party member Neville Perkins, the first indigenous person in Australia to hold a shadow ministry in an Australian parliament. The seat had been held by Perkins since 1977.

The CLP selected Aboriginal film activist Rosalie Kunoth-Monks, as its candidate. The Labor candidate was Neil Bell.

Results

References

1981 elections in Australia
Northern Territory by-elections